Bobtown is an unincorporated community in Hamilton Township, Jackson County, Indiana.

Bobtown was likely founded after 1900.

Geography

References

Unincorporated communities in Jackson County, Indiana
Unincorporated communities in Indiana